In astronomy, a semiregular variable star, a type of variable star, is a giant or supergiant of intermediate and late (cooler) spectral type showing considerable periodicity in its light changes, accompanied or sometimes interrupted by various irregularities. Periods lie in the range from 20 to more than 2000 days, while the shapes of the light curves may be rather different and variable with each cycle.  The amplitudes may be from several hundredths to several magnitudes (usually 1-2 magnitudes in the V filter).

Classification
The semiregular variable stars have been sub-divided into four categories for many decades, with a fifth related group defined more recently.  The original definitions of the four main groups were formalised in 1958 at the tenth general assembly of the International Astronomical Union (IAU).  The General Catalogue of Variable Stars (GCVS) has updated the definitions with some additional information and provided newer reference stars where old examples such as S Vul have been re-classified.

Pulsation
The semiregular variable stars, particularly the SRa and SRb sub-classes, are often grouped with the Mira variables under the long-period variable heading.  In other situations, the term is expanded to cover almost all cool pulsating stars.  The semi-regular giant stars are closely related to the Mira variables: Mira stars generally pulsate in the fundamental mode; semiregular giants pulsate in one or more overtones.

Photometric studies in the Large Magellanic Cloud looking for gravitational microlensing events have shown that essentially all cool evolved stars are variable, with the coolest stars showing very large amplitudes and warmer stars showing only micro-variations.  The semiregular variable stars fall on one of five main period-luminosity relationship sequences identified, differing from the Mira variables only in pulsating in an overtone mode.  The closely related OSARG (OGLE small amplitude red giant) variables pulsate in an unknown mode.

Many semiregular variables show long secondary periods around ten times the main pulsation period, with amplitudes of a few tenths of a magnitude at visual wavelengths.  The cause of the pulsations is not known.

Bright examples
η Gem is the brightest SRa variable, and also an eclipsing binary. GZ Peg is an SRa variable and S-type star with a maximum magnitude of 4.95.  T Cen is listed as the next-brightest SRa example, but it is suggested that it may actually be an RV Tauri variable, which would make it by far the brightest member of that class.

There are numerous naked-eye SRb stars, with third-magnitude L2 Pup being the brightest listed in the GCVS.  σ Lib and ρ Per are also third-magnitude SRb stars at maximum brightness.  β Gru is a second magnitude star classified as a slow irregular variable by the GCVS, but reported to be of SRa type by later research.  These four are all class M giants, although some SRb variables are carbon stars such as UU Aur or S-type stars such as Pi1 Gru.

Catalogued SRc stars are less numerous, but include some of the brightest stars in the sky such as Betelgeuse and α Her.  Although SRc stars are defined as being supergiants, a number of them have giant spectral luminosity classes and some such as α Her are known to be asymptotic giant branch stars.

Many SRd stars are extremely luminous hypergiants, including the naked-eye ρ Cas, V509 Cas, and ο1 Cen.  Others are classified as giant stars, but the brightest example is the seventh-magnitude LU Aqr.

Most SRS variables have been discovered in deep large-scale surveys, but the naked-eye stars V428 And, AV Ari, and EL Psc are also members.

See also
List of semiregular variable stars
Low-dimensional chaos in stellar pulsations
Variable star designation

References

External links
 EU Delphini and the Small-Amplitude Pulsating Red Giants
 Y Lyncis
 Pulsating variable stars and the H-R diagram
 OGLE Atlas of Variable Star Light Curves - Semiregular Variables